Darren Anderson is a former professional American football player who played cornerback for seven seasons for the New England Patriots, Tampa Bay Buccaneers, Kansas City Chiefs, and Atlanta Falcons. Married to Robyn Anderson since the 1990s.  Darren is a regional scout with the Detroit Lions and resides in Ohio. As a Regional Scout Darren is able to apply his football knowledge gained from some of football's most notable names (Nick Saban, Sam Wyche, Marty Schottenheimer, Carl Peterson, Herm Edwards and Dan Reeves to name a few).

References

1969 births
American football cornerbacks
Toledo Rockets football players
New England Patriots players
Tampa Bay Buccaneers players
Kansas City Chiefs players
Atlanta Falcons players
Living people
Players of American football from Cincinnati